This is a timeline of music in Greater Manchester

19th Century

1830s
 1836
 23 September: Esteemed Spanish opera singer Maria Malibran dies after collapsing while performing at the Theatre Royal on Fountain Street

1840s
1840
The first (temporary) Free Trade Hall is built
1842
The second Free Trade Hall is built

1850s
1853
Conductor Charles Hallé first moves to Manchester to direct the orchestra for Gentlemen's Concerts
1856
8 October: The third (and last) Free Trade Hall (begun 1853) is completed
1857
Fledgling Hallé orchestra formed
1858
30 January: The Hallé gives its first concert as a permanent orchestra under Charles Hallé at the Free Trade Hall

1880s
1888
Charles Hallé is knighted

1890s
1893
October: Royal Manchester College of Music, established by Charles Hallé, admits its first students
1899
Hans Richter is appointed music director of The Hallé, a post which he will hold until 1911

20th Century

1900s
1901
CWS (Manchester) Band formed as the CWS Tobacco Factory Band
Hulme Hippodrome opens, becoming a variety theatre, with skiffle and rock gigs in 1950s (becomes a Mecca bingo hall in 1962, gigs again in 1980s and 2010s)
1902
The Playhouse, Hulme, opens (later a BBC Studio, 1955-1986)
1904
 Ardwick Empire (later, Manchester Hippodrome) opens as a music hall (demolished 1964)
1908
3 December: The Hallé gives the world première of Elgar's Symphony No. 1 under Hans Richter at the Free Trade Hall

1910s
1910
 Kings Hall at Belle Vue Zoological Gardens opens
1912
26 December: Manchester Opera House opens as the New Theatre in Quay Street

1920s
1920s
Manchester Jazz Appreciation Society founded, meeting in the Unicorn Hotel off Oldham Street
1922
15 November: The British Broadcasting Company begins regular radio broadcasts from its Manchester station 2ZY at the Metropolitan-Vickers works in Trafford Park. The 2ZY Orchestra, predecessor of the BBC Philharmonic, is formed
1927
The Ritz (Manchester) is built in Whitworth Street West, Manchester.

1930s
1930
November: Maurice Chevalier plays 4 concerts at Belle Vue, Manchester
1934
The Northern Studio Orchestra is renamed the BBC Northern Orchestra
1935
7 March: Sergei Rachmaninoff gives the English première of his Rhapsody on a Theme of Paganini with The Hallé under Nikolai Malko at the Free Trade Hall.

1940s
1940
22–24 December: Heaviest raids of the Manchester Blitz by the Luftwaffe. Cross Street Chapel is destroyed, the Free Trade Hall is gutted and many other buildings  badly damaged
1943
John Barbirolli is appointed principal conductor of The Hallé, a post which he will hold until 1968
1946
3 February: The Hallé Orchestra and Chorus (conducted by John Barbirolli) perform Aida at Belle Vue, Manchester
1949
2 October: Yehudi Menuhin and the Liverpool Philharmonic (conducted by Malcolm Sargent) play at Belle Vue, Manchester
John Barbirolli is knighted
Ewan MacColl writes 'Dirty Old Town' about Salford

1950s
1950s
Some music students in Manchester informally constitute New Music Manchester
1950
Ewan MacColl releases his first single 'The Asphalter’s Song' on Topic Records
1951
The Free Trade Hall, rebuilt after bomb damage, reopens as a concert venue
1956
November: Johnnie Ray plays at Belle Vue, Manchester
1957
13 February: Bill Haley and his Comets play at the Odeon, Manchester
Ewan MacColl writes 'The First Time Ever I Saw Your Face' for Peggy Seeger
1959
9 March: Louis Armstrong and The All-Stars play the King’s Hall at Belle Vue, Manchester
July: Marty Wilde plays at the Free Trade Hall
15 November: Three of the later Beatles (as Johnny and the Moondogs) play in the regional finals of a TV talent show at Manchester Hippodrome, Ardwick Green. Heats had been held at the Liverpool Empire during October. Possibly their first stage gig outside of Liverpool. John, Paul and George reportedly couldn't afford lodgings so had to leave to return to Liverpool before the final voting.

1960s
1962
7 March, The Beatles record at The Playhouse, Hulme, for BBC Radio, Teenager's Turn - Here We Go, (transmitted on 8 March). They return on 11 June 1962, this time recording their first Lennon-McCartney song, Ask Me Why (transmitted on 15 June)
March: Freddie and the Dreamers are formed in West Didsbury
21 October: The first American Folk Blues Festival European tour plays its only UK date at the Free Trade Hall; artists include Sonny Terry, Brownie McGhee and T-Bone Walker. It will be influential on the British R&B scene, with the audience including Mick Jagger, Keith Richards and Brian Jones of The Rolling Stones with Jimmy Page, John Mayall and other musicians, and with a second show filmed and shown on ITV.
December: The Hollies are formed in Manchester
1963
February: The Beatles play a sold-out show at the Oasis coffee bar/venue on Lloyd Street
June: Wayne Fontana and the Mindbenders are formed
The Toggery Five are formed in Manchester
Twisted Wheel Club music venue opened by the Abadi brothers in Brazenose Street, replaces the Left Wing Coffee Bar
1964
29 March: Jerry Lee Lewis plays at the Kings Hall, Belle Vue, Manchester
22 May: Carl Perkins and The Nashville Teens play at the Odeon, Manchester
6 June: Carl Perkins and the Nashville Teens play at the Twisted Wheel Club, Manchester
29 September: Bill Haley & His Comets play at the Odeon, Manchester
9 October: Bill Haley and his Comets play at both the Astoria, Manchester and the Odeon, Manchester
Herman's Hermits are formed
1965
April-May: Freddie and the Dreamers, Wayne Fontana and the Mindbenders and Herman's Hermits consecutively top the American Billboard charts
1966
1 January: Manchester Corporation Act comes into force effectively shutting down many coffee bars, clubs and venues
17 May: Bob Dylan and the Hawks perform at the Free Trade Hall. Dylan is booed by the audience because of his decision to tour with an electric band, culminating in a famous shout of "Judas"
31 July: Jethro Tull play at Belle Vue, Manchester
4 September: The Who play Belle Vue, Manchester
September: Barclay James Harvest are formed in Oldham
11 December): Family play at Belle Vue
The Toggery Five disband
1967
24 May: Jimi Hendrix plays at Belle Vue
1968
After 25 years with The Hallé, John Barbirolli retires from the principal conductorship
1969
Chetham's Hospital becomes Chetham's School of Music

1970s
1971 
17 August: Johnny Cash plays first of 3 shows at the Kings Hall, Belle Vue
30 November: Led Zeppelin play at the Kings Hall, Belle Vue
Herman's Hermits disband
Twisted Wheel Club closes down
1972
July: T. Rex perform at Belle Vue
10cc are formed in Stockport
Mott the Hoople play the Free Trade Hall
1973
October: The Royal Manchester College of Music merges with the Northern School of Music to form the Royal Northern College of Music
Alberto y Lost Trios Paranoias are formed in Manchester
1975
Houghton Weavers are formed in Westhoughton, Bolton
Slaughter & the Dogs are formed in Wythenshawe, Manchester
1976
February: Buzzcocks are formed in Bolton
1 April: Buzzcocks play for first time at Bolton Institute of Technology
4 June: Sex Pistols play at the Lesser Free Trade Hall in Manchester
20 July: Sex Pistols play at the Lesser Free Trade Hall in Manchester, supported by Buzzcocks and Slaughter & the Dogs
December: Sex Pistols play twice at the Electric Circus, Manchester in December 1976, including 9 December 1976
Electric Circus, Manchester opens as a punk rock venue
Sad Café are formed in Manchester
1977
January: The Damned play at the Electric Circus, Manchester
April: Magazine are formed in Manchester by Howard Devoto and John McGeoch
8 May: *White Riot Tour play at the Electric Circus, Manchester featuring The Clash, The Slits, Buzzcocks and Subway Sect
29 May: Warsaw play for the first time at the Electric Circus, Manchester (despite being billed as The Stiff Kittens), supporting Buzzcocks, Penetration, John Cooper Clarke and Jon the Postman.
2 October: Electric Circus, Manchester closes (see also: Short Circuit: Live at the Electric Circus)
A Certain Ratio are formed in Flixton
Godley & Creme are formed in Manchester
The Ramones play first gig in Manchester at the Electric Circus, Manchester
1978
The Durutti Column are founded in Manchester
Factory Records is founded by Tony Wilson and Alan Erasmus
Warsaw are renamed Joy Division

1980s
1980
Happy Mondays formed in Salford
1981
Buzzcocks disband
The Chameleons are formed in Middleton, Greater Manchester
1982
11 May: Eurovision Young Musicians 1982 contest takes place at the Free Trade Hall
21 May: The Haçienda opens as a nightclub in Whitworth Street
May: The Smiths are formed
4 October: The Smiths play their first gig, supporting Blue Rondo à la Turk at The Ritz (Manchester)
A Witness are formed in Stockport
Alberto y Lost Trios Paranoias disband
James formed in Whalley Range, Manchester
The BBC Northern Orchestra is renamed the BBC Philharmonic
1983
6 July: The Smiths play at the The Haçienda, Manchester
Big Flame are formed in Manchester
Inspiral Carpets are formed in Oldham
The Membranes relocate to Manchester
The Stone Roses are formed in Manchester
Wax formed by Andrew Gold and Graham Gouldman
1984
Too Much Texas formed in Manchester
1986
Blue Zone are formed
1987
Autechre are formed in Rochdale
The Chameleons disband
Man from Delmonte are formed in Manchester
The Smiths disband
17 October: Desmond Decker and the Aces play at Hulme Hippodrome 
1988
Electronic are formed by Bernard Sumner and Johnny Marr
1989
Buzzcocks are re-formed

1990s
1990
M People formed by Mike Pickering
1991
 2 May: Nina Simone plays at the opening of the NIA Centre (1991-1997), at The Playhouse, Hulme
 18 August: Oasis play their first gig, at the Boardwalk club
Oasis are formed in Manchester
1993
Happy Mondays disband
Black Grape are formed in Salford by Shaun Ryder and Bez
1995
15 July: Manchester Arena opens at Victoria station
Goldblade are formed in Manchester by John Robb
Inspiral Carpets disband
1996
27 & 28 April: Oasis play at Maine Road, Manchester
3 & 4 August: Oasis play at Balloch Country Park, Scotland, to an audience of 80,000 over the two nights
10 & 11 August: Oasis play the Knebworth Festival to an audience of 125,000 people each night
11 September: Bridgewater Hall opens as an orchestral concert venue. The Free Trade Hall closes this year as a public venue and is subsequently redeveloped as an hotel
Lamb are formed in Manchester
1997
Elbow are formed in Bury
1998
Doves are formed in Manchester
1999
I Am Kloot are formed in Manchester

21st Century

2000s
2000
The Chameleons are re-formed
2003
The Chameleons disband again
2006
14 April: Manchester Passion television special broadcast by BBC Three from Manchester
Courteeners are formed in Middleton
 2007
28 June–15 July: Inaugural Manchester International Festival.
2008
Elbow win the Mercury Music Prize for their album The Seldom Seen Kid
2009
August: Oasis disband after the departure of Noel Gallagher
Elbow win the Brit Award for Best British Group

2010s
2011
17 November: Children in Need Rocks Manchester charity music concert is held at the Manchester Arena
The Ritz is taken over by HMV and given a £2 million refurbishment
2013
3 April: Blossoms play for first time at the Night and Day Cafe, Oldham Street, Manchester 
2015
The Ritz is acquired by Live Nation Entertainment and re-branded as O2 Ritz Manchester
2016
I Am Kloot disband
2017
22 May: Manchester Arena bombing: A Manchester-born suicide bomber kills 22 as young people leave an Ariana Grande concert at the Manchester Arena
2019
4-21 July: Manchester International Festival, including Laurie Anderson, Philip Glass, Abida Parveen and Skepta.

2020s
2021
10 September: New Order play at Heaton Park, Manchester
The Chameleons are re-formed again
2022
11 June: The Killers play at the Old Trafford Cricket Ground, supported by Blossoms

Music in Manchester - births and deaths
Gem Archer (b.1966, Durham - The Edge, The Contenders, Whirlpool, Heavy Stereo, Oasis, Beady Eye, High Flying Birds
John Barbirolli (b.1899, London) (d.1970, London) - The Hallé
Andy Bell (b.1970, Cardiff) - Ride, Hurricane #1, Oasis, Beady Eye
Bez (b.1964, Salford) - Happy Mondays, Black Grape
Tim Booth (b.1960, Bradford) - James
Mark Burgess (b.1960, Manchester) - The Chameleons, Black Swan Lane, ChameleonsVox
Bernie Calvert (b.1942, Brierfield) - Ricky Shaw and the Dolphins, The Hollies
Allan Clarke (b.1942, Salford) - The Fourtones, The Hollies 
John Cooper Clarke (b.1949, Salford)
Lol Creme (b.1947, Prestwich) - 10cc, Godley & Creme, Art of Noise
Ian Curtis (b.1956, Stretford) (d.1980, Macclesfield) - Warsaw, Joy Division
Howard Devoto (b.1952, Scunthorpe) - Buzzcocks, Magazine
Bobby Elliott (b.1941, Burnley) - Shane Fenton and the Fentones, The Hollies
Alan Erasmus (b.1949, Manchester)
Georgie Fame (b.1943, Leigh) - Georgie Fame and the Blue Flames
Wayne Fontana (b.1945, Levenshulme) (d.2020, Stockport) - Wayne Fontana and the Mindbenders
Liam Fray (b.1985, Middleton) - Courteeners
Liam Gallagher (b.1972, Longsight) - Oasis, Beady Eye
Noel Gallagher (b.1967, Longsight) - Oasis, High Flying Birds
Freddie Garrity (b.1936, Crumpsall) (d.2006, Bangor) - Freddie and the Dreamers
Gillian Gilbert (b.1961, Whalley Range, Manchester) - New Order
Jim Glennie (b.1963, Moss Side) - James
Kevin Godley (b.1945, Prestwich) - 10cc, Godley & Creme
Jimi Goodwin (b.1970, Manchester) - Sub Sub, Doves
Graham Gouldman (b.1946, Salford) - 10cc
Rob Gretton (b.1953, Wythenshawe) (d.1999)
Charles Hallé (b.1819, Hagen) (d.1895, Manchester) - The Hallé
Martin Hannett (b.1948, Manchester) (d.1991, Manchester)
Eric Haydock (b.1943, Stockport) (d.2019) - The Hollies
Tony Hicks (b.1945, Nelson) - Ricky Shaw and the Dolphins, The Hollies
Peter Hook (b.1956, Broughton, Salford) - Warsaw, Joy Division, New Order, Revenge, Monaco, Peter Hook and the Light 
Mike Joyce (b.1963, Fallowfield) - The Smiths 
CP Lee (b.1950, Didsbury) (d.2020) - Greasy Bear, Alberto y Lost Trios Paranoias
Harvey Lisberg (b.1940, Manchester)
Ewan MacColl (b.1915, Salford) (d.1989, London)
Maria Malibran (b.1808, Paris) (d.1836, Manchester)
Johnny Marr (b.1963, Manchester) - The Smiths, The The, Electronic, Modest Mouse, The Cribs
John Mayall (b.1933, Macclesfield) - John Mayall & the Bluesbreakers
John McGeoch (b.1955, Greenock) (d.2004, Launceston) - Magazine, Visage, Siouxsie and the Banshees, The Armoury Show, Public Image Ltd
Bruce Mitchell (b.1940, Didsbury) - Greasy Bear, Alberto y Lost Trios Paranoias, The Durutti Column
Stephen Morris (b.1957, Macclesfield) - Warsaw, Joy Division, New Order
Morrissey (b.1959, Davyhulme) - The Nosebleeds, The Smiths
Graham Nash (b.1942, Blackpool) - The Fourtones, The Hollies, Crosby, Stills, Nash & Young
Peter Noone (b.1947, Davyhulme) - Herman's Hermits
Mike Pickering (b.1954, Manchester) - Quando Quango, M People
Vini Reilly (b.1953, Blackley) - Ed Banger and the Nosebleeds, The Durutti Column
Lou Rhodes (b.1964, Manchester) - Lamb
Hans Richter (b.1843, Raab) (d.1916, Bayreuth) - The Hallé
John Robb (b.1961, Fleetwood) - The Membranes, Goldblade
Andy Rourke (b.1964, Manchester) - The Smiths, Freebass
Rowetta (b.1966, Manchester) - Happy Mondays
Paul Ryder (b.1964, Little Hulton) (d.2022) - Happy Mondays, Big Arm
Shaun Ryder (b.1962, Little Hulton) - Happy Mondays, Black Grape
Pete Shelley (b.1955, Leigh) (d.2018, Tallinn) - Buzzcocks
Lisa Stansfield (b.1966, Manchester) -Blue Zone
Vic Steele (b.1945, Manchester) - Emperors of Rhythm, The Hollies
Eric Stewart (b.1945, Droylsden) - Emperors of Rhythm, Wayne Fontana and the Mindbenders, 10cc
Bernard Sumner (b.1956, Broughton, Salford) - Warsaw, Joy Division, New Order, Electronic, Bad Lieutenant
Terry Sylvester (b.1947, Allerton) - The Escorts, The Swinging Blue Jeans, The Hollies
Andy Williams (b.1970, Manchester) - Sub Sub, Doves, Black Rivers
Jez Williams (b.1970, Manchester) - Sub Sub, Doves, Black Rivers
Tony Wilson (b.1950, Pendleton) (d.2007, Withington)
Paul Young (b.1947, Benchill) (d.2000, Hale) - The Toggery Five, Gyro, Sad Café, Mike and the Mechanics

References

Sources 

Music
Music in Manchester